Zhang Hejun (simplified Chinese: 张德钧) is a Chinese businessman and billionaire who founded inverter manufacturer Ningbo Deye Technology which went public on the Shanghai Stock Exchange in 2021.

Forbes lists his net worth as of April 2022 at $4.5 billion USD.

References 

Chinese billionaires
Chinese company founders
20th-century Chinese businesspeople
21st-century Chinese businesspeople
Living people
Year of birth missing (living people)